James E. Putnam (born April 18, 1940) was an American politician in the state of South Dakota. He was a member of the South Dakota House of Representatives and South Dakota State Senate. He was Majority Whip of the House from 1993 to 1996.

References

Living people
1940 births
Republican Party members of the South Dakota House of Representatives
People from Armour, South Dakota
Republican Party South Dakota state senators